= Simms Island =

Island in California

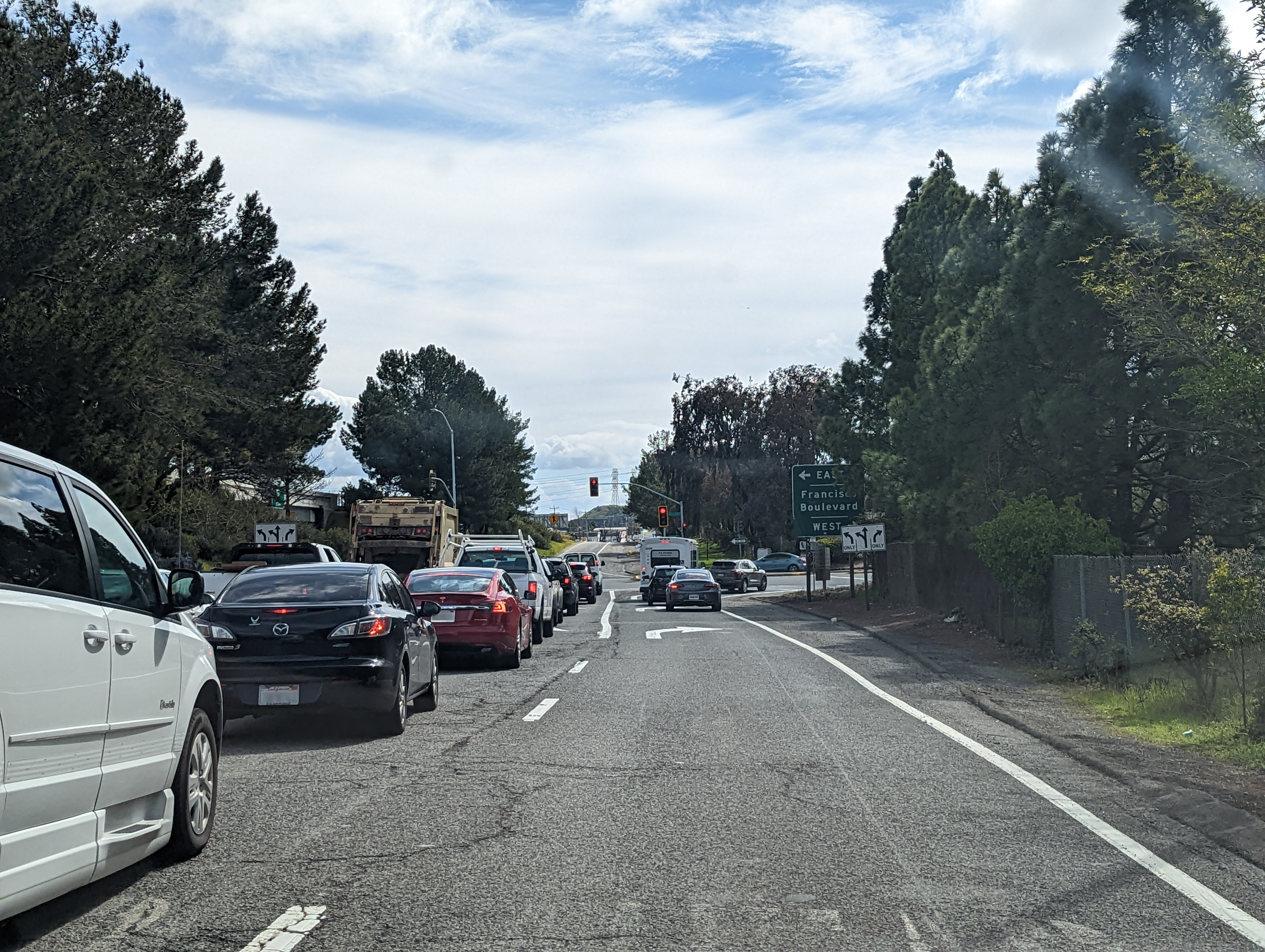
- The former location of Simms Island in March 2023.

- Location within San Francisco Bay Area Location within California Location within the United States

Geography
- Location: Northern California
- Coordinates: 37°57′33″N 122°30′18″W
- Adjacent to: San Francisco Bay
- Highest elevation: 13 ft (4 m)

Administration
- United States
- State: California
- County: Marin

Simms Island is a former marsh island in San Francisco Bay. It is in Marin County, California; Its coordinates are 37°57′33″N 122°30′18″W, and the United States Geological Survey (USGS) gave its elevation as 13 ft (4.0 m) in 1981. It appears as an island on a USGS map in 1897; it is labeled in a 1954 map, but fully connected to the mainland.

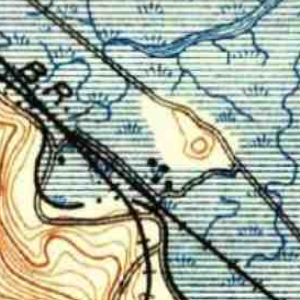
USGS survey map from 1897.

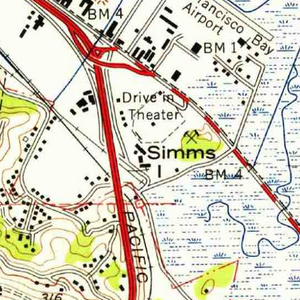
USGS survey map from 1954.

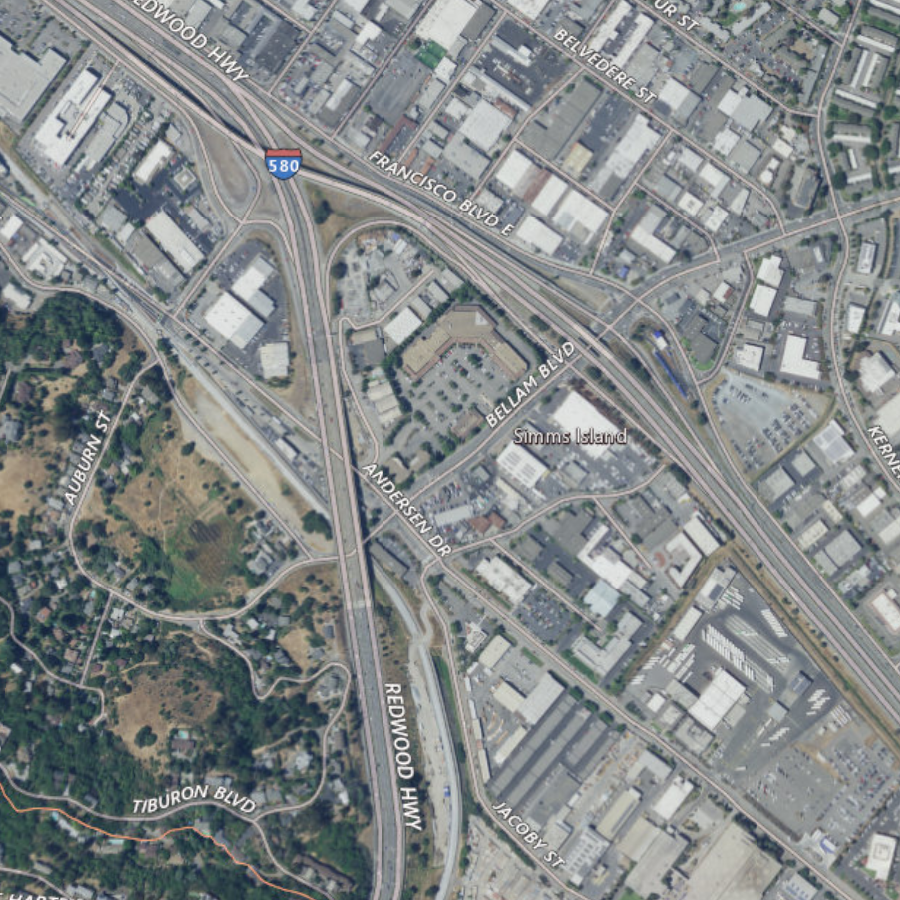
USGS aerial imagery from 2021.
